Moore Equipment Company was founded in 1929 by Stanley S. Moore and his father in Stockton, California. Moore Equipment Company a repair and manufacture company of farm machines, road machines and tools.  To support the World War 2 demand for ships Moore Equipment Company built a shipyard and switched over to military construction and built: US Navy YSD-11 Class Seaplane Wrecking Derricks, landing craft and barges. Moore Equipment Company also did work for the US Army repairing and rebuilding jeeps by way of the Ford Motor in Richmond. The shipyard also did Navy ship repair.  Moore Equipment Company's main work before the war was on tractors, cranes, trucks, bulldozers, power winches, road scrapers and tools. The Moore Equipment Company office was at 1250 South Wilson Way, Stockton, now the Fairgrounds Industrial Park. Equipment Company sold the factory on February 15, 1944 to International Harvester Company. The shipyard closed after the war.</ref>

Moore Equipment Company
Moore Equipment Company in Stockton, California built YSD-11 Class Seaplane Wrecking Derrick:

Landing craft

Moore Equipment Company built Landing Craft Mechanized (LCM) Mark 6.

Landing Craft Mechanized Mark 6 had :
 Power plant:
 2 Detroit 6-71 diesel engines;  sustained; twin shaft; or
 2 Detroit 8V-71 diesel engines;  sustained; twin shaft
 Length: 56.2 feet (17.1 m)
 Beam: 14 feet (4.3 m)
 Displacement: 64 tons (65 metric tons) full load
 Speed: 9 knots (10.3 mph, 16.6 km/h)
 Range: 130 miles (240 km) at 
 Military lift: 34 tons (34.6 metric tons) or 80 troops
 Crew: 5

Barges
Built in 1945 four YC barges:
YC-1089, barge a Type B ship, delivered  11 September 1945, remove from Navy 13 March 2001. Displacement 120 t.(lite) 590 t.(full); Length 110 feet; Beam 35 feet and Draft 8 feet.
YC-1090 	 
YC-1091 	  	 
YC-1092

See also
 California during World War II
Maritime history of California
Wooden boats of World War 2

References

American Theater of World War II
1940s in California
American boat builders
Defunct shipbuilding companies of the United States